Insanity is the second full-length studio album from melodic death metal band Darkane, released on March 6, 2001. It is the first Darkane album with Andreas Sydow in the band. The album's name came from the chaotic events that happened while recording the album such as a storm that caused a power outage. The opening track "Calamitas" got it name from the Latin word for "loss".

Track listing

Credits

Darkane
Andreas Sydow - vocals, lyrics (3)
Christofer Malmström - lead guitar, lyrics (2, 6, 9 & 10), choir vocals
Klas Ideberg - rhythm guitar
Jörgen Löfberg - bass guitar, lyrics (4)
Peter Wildoer - drums, lyrics (5, 8 & 11)
Darkane - engineering, backing vocals

Other personnel

Additional musician
Fredrik Thordendal - guitar solo on "Psychic Pain"

Album design
Maximilian 'Evil Twin' - logo
Thomas Ewerhard - artwork, layout design
Stefan Ideberg - band photos

Production
Peter in de Betou - mastering (at the Cutting Room, Stockholm)
Daniel Bergstrand - engineering, audio mixing 
Wez Wenedikter - music executive

Classical participants

Classical musicians
Thomas Widlund  – timpani, percussion
Joacim Wåhlstedt - french horn
Lars Thapper - french horn 
Harry Ellström - double bass
Markus Närvik - double bass
Dan Hedborg - cello 
Håkan Westlund - cello 
Bo-Göte Nygren - viola
Lisbeth Westberg - violin and viola
Jonas Dahlman - violin

The Calamitas Choir
Niclas Kåse – conductor
Anette Westerholm
Ann Skjelmose
Camilla Grahn
Catharina Müller
Charlotte Olsson
Hans Malmström
Henrik Rosenberg  
Inger Jarlstedt
Isabelle Malmström

Jan Ahlgren
Johan Engström
Kajsa Åström
Magnus Rosenberg
Maria Andersson
Martin Fröhberg
Matias Steen
Niclas Fröhberg
Nils-Erik Rosdahl
Richard Johansson 
Sofia Levin

Susanne Kjellsson
Sven Gudmundsson
Therese Malmström
Thomas Bursell

References

2001 albums
Darkane albums
Nuclear Blast albums